Robert Kiplagat Andersen (also known as Robert K. Andersen; born 12 December 1972) is a retired Kenyan-born middle-distance runner who ran internationally for Denmark. He competed in the 1500 metres at the 1995 World Championships, reaching the semifinals, and the 1997 World Championships, reaching the final.

International competitions

Personal bests
Outdoor
800 metres – 1:46.47 (Malmö 1997)
1000 metres – 2:19.78 (Florø 1997)
1500 metres – 3:31.17 (Zürich 1997)
One mile – 3:50.79 (Berlin 1997)
3000 metres – 8:09.98 (Malmö 2004)
5000 metres – 13:51.22 (Heusden-Zolder 2004)
Indoor
800 metres – 1:53.36 (Malmö 2001)
1000 metres – 2:24.22 (Erfurt 1997)
1500 metres – 3:39.78 (Stuttgart 1998)
3000 metres – 7:54.72 (Paris 1997)

References

All-Athletics profile

1972 births
Living people
Danish male middle-distance runners
Kenyan emigrants to Denmark
World Athletics Championships athletes for Denmark